Mariusz Zdzisław Puzio (born 12 March 1966) is a Polish former ice hockey player. He played for Polonia Bytom, TKH Toruń, Unia Oświęcim, and Zagłębie Sosnowiec during his career. He also played for the Polish national team at the 1992 Winter Olympics, and multiple World Championships. In 1992 Puzio led the Polish league in scoring. He holds the record for most games played in Poland, with 758.

References

External links
 

1966 births
Living people
Ice hockey players at the 1992 Winter Olympics
KH Zagłębie Sosnowiec players
Olympic ice hockey players of Poland
People from Mysłowice
Sportspeople from Silesian Voivodeship
Polish ice hockey forwards
TH Unia Oświęcim players
TKH Toruń players
TMH Polonia Bytom players